Amoroto is a town and municipality located in the province of Biscay, in the Basque Country.

References

External links
 AMOROTO in the Bernardo Estornés Lasa - Auñamendi Encyclopedia (Euskomedia Fundazioa) 

Municipalities in Biscay